Sunyeophaa also Lakshmi Singha ( – 13 December 1780), was the 34th Ahom king. After Rajeswar Singha's death, he married Queen Kuranganayani and became the king of the Ahom kingdom.  Shortly after he was installed he became a captive of the rebels of the Moamoria rebellion for a few months but soon regained his kingdom. With the help of Kuranganayani, after destroying all the Moamoria rebels including Borbaruah Ragho, Lakhmi Singha was once again crowned as king of Ahom kingdom.

Accession
Lakshmi Singha earlier known as Kalsilya Gohian was born in Kalsilya at a royal camp during Rudra Singha reign, Lakshmi Singha, who in spite of his alleged illegitimacy because of his very blackish complexion and was so different than his father, succeeded Rajeswar Singha, in 1769 at Dergaon. Keertichandra Borbarua  supported the Namrup Raja, Lakshmi Singha, the youngest son of Rudra Singha who, he said, wanted that all his sons should become king in turn. The BarGohain and others supported the eldest son of Rajeswar Singha and raised doubts about the legitimacy of Lakshmi Singha, who was so different from Rudra Singha in complexion and features. Ultimately, however, Lakshmi Singha, already 53, was selected, the Parbatiya Gosain refused to recognise him on the ground of illegitimacy; Lakshmi Singha imported from Bengal a new priest, a Sakta, who was the first Na Gosain; and banished Rajeswar Singha's two sons, the Rajas of Tipam and Saring, to Namrup. Lakshmi Singha witnessed the first challenge to the Ahom monarchy organised by a group of disciples of Mayamara Satra, who had been long seating under the oppression of the government.

First Moamariya Rebellion
With the rise of Keertichandra Borbarua, fresh insults were heaped upon the Moamoriyas. With a view of to counteracting the growing influence of the Mayamara Mahanta, the Barbarua himself became a disciple of the Dihing Satra and raised the Guru to an eminent position at the royal court. Over-zealous to subdue the Moamariyas. he used to find fault with them in every matter. This was too much tolerated the Deka Mahanta had already measured the numerical strength of his followers of his Satra, which came to be eight lakhs. He had also discussed plans of revenge with the Goanburhas(headmen) with a view to exterminating Keertichandra Borbarua   and occupying the Ahom throne. But the Mahanta Astabhujdeva dissuaded his sons and Goanburhas from involving themselves in such 'a dangerous affair' on the plea that better opportunities were bound to come sooner or later.

Soon after, early in October 1769, Nahar Khora and Ragha Moran, both disciples of the Mayamara Satra, were mercilessly beaten and the ears of the former cut off at the orders of the Barbarua on the alleged charge of bringing for him a lean elephant. Ragha writing in pain cried out: "This land is infested with devils. The sun, the moon, the air and the clouds are standing spectators of this injustice and cruelty. Retribution is writ large on the fate of the wrong doer". When the followers of Nahar took both of them took both of them under heavy bandages to their Guru at Khutiapota  the latter was shocked to learn of the incident and could not but give a qualified sanction to take up arms against the Ahom government.

Rebellion
The Morans were the first to raise the banner of rebellion. Towards the close of October 1769, When the Barbarua sent his men to cut timber from the Maran area, the people of the locality led by Nahar's two wives Bhatuki and Bhabuli, who took the names Radha and Rukmini, respectively, refused them entrance to the area and declared that they were independent under their own king and Barbarua. Considering it a minor local uprising, the king sent a small contingent of 2,000 soldiers under the command of a Tekela Bara named Bez but the army sustained a serious defeat with the loss of vast quantity of provisions. The Tekela Bara made a hair-breadth escape and informed the king of the seriousness of the situation. He further reported that two female leaders were possessed of supernatural powers by whose strength they were catching the bullets in their chadars or wrappers.

Meanwhile, another division of the Moamariyas of 7,000 strong, under the command of Ragha had pitched their camp on the bank of the Secha, and in the south of river Dihing a strong advance guard was stationed at Namrup. The inhabitants of the area, who were mostly Morans and Kacharis extended their full support to the rebellion. The Moamroriyas then made alliance with the three exiled Ahom princes- Mohanmala Maladev Gohain, third son of Rudra Singha, and Saru Gohain and Ratneshwar, both sons of Rajeswar Singha, assuring them in case they won success, they would place one of them on the throne. 

The rebels calculated that such a declaration could create confusion in the royalist camp, fore these princes. Especially Mohanmala Gohain, were extremely popular and their banishment was considered as an act of grave injustice on the part of Ahom government. This had desired effect on the royalist camp. Considering the gravity of the situation, the king summoned a meeting of the nobles to discuss measures to be taken against the rebles, Whereas a few among them could realise that the rebellion was of a serious nature and quelled by peace overtures, others like Kirti Chandra Barbarua, over confident of success underestimated the strength of the rebels and pursuance of arms.

Accordingly, a fresh army of 14,000 strong was despatched under the command of Harnath Senapati Phukan. The royalist then built a bridge of boat across the river Secha and advanced towards the rebels, who them destroyed the bridge and intercepted their movement. This had put the royalist into serious straits: there was acute shortage of food followed by an outbreak of fever and dysentery. The Phukan, who, despite al these miseries, was resolved to fight, was arrested by the rebels and put under sonfinment. His soldiers then immediately surrendered to the Moamariyas. The news had unnerved Lakshmi Singha. He then sent orders to Duara Barphukan of Guwahati to recuirt soldiers from the vassal states of Rani, Luki and Topakuchi, as they were not supposed to have sympathy for the rebels. He also sent men to the Manipuri King Jai Singha seeking his help. Meanwhile, the royalist soldiers were defeated by the Moamariyas in several engagements, which created a panic in their camp. It was also found that in many cases the royalist soldier walked over to the side of the rebels or desisted from fighting. Not only the war machine but even the spy system became inoperative as the Moamoriyas disciples serving as attendants of the Barbarua communicated to the rebles all the war-plans of the royal camp. Meanwhile, the triumphant Moamariyas crossed the Charaideo hill on their way to Garhgoan, the old Ahom capital, raising slogans that they would be protected by their own Gurus while the King's swordsmen and matchlockemen, who also were the disciples of their Guru, would work only to bring ruin on the Government and that they would kill or get killed to repay their debt to their Guru 

In no time the Moamariyas occupied Garhgoan and then Marched towards the new capital at Rangpur under the command of Ragha. The king sent the Gauhati detachment, which had just reached Rangpur under the Dihingia Phukan of Rangpur to proceed across the Dhai Ali and despatched two other Contingents-one under the Dihingia Phukan of Gauhati to march along the Tamulibazar road and the other under Barpatra Gohain to advance across Lechang. But the Moamariays completely routed them

Flight from the capital 
The situation thus became extremely critical.  Having no way out, the king left the capital on the night of November 21, 1769. He was accompanied by Kirti Chandra Borbarua, Bhagi Buragohain, Duara Borphuakn and a few nobles, as half of the Phukans and Baruas deserted him and decided to remain at Rangpur. The Borpatragohain also didn't accompany him. On their way to Gauhati, fugitives were compelled to halt at Chintamanigarh on the bank of river Sonai, as the boatmen, who were disciples of the Mayamara Mahanta, would not agree to ply the vessels for the benefit of the Ahom king and his followers The king and the nobles then began to discuss their future course of action against the Moamariyas. When such discussion among the royalist leaders were going on at Chintamanigarh, the rebels led by Ragha occupied the capital at midnight. A group of 400 rebels then pursued the king and captured him and his followers in their shelter at day-break.

Captive
The king brought back to Rangpur and confined in the Jaysagar temple. The Barbarua and his sons were chained with iron fetters. The Moamariays thus became the masters of Rangpur. They retained the Ahom administrative structure but selected all officers, including the Barphukan and the principal officers of the Guwahati establishment, from amongst them. The three cabinet ministers were taken from amongst the eligible Ahom families . The Deka Mahanta was made king and Ragha was made the Barbarua. Then deposed king Lakshmi Singha was then brought before the new king and made to salute the latter. Meanwhile, they killed the exiled princes . The Deka Mahanta did not long remain the king as this act of his greatly offended his father, He, therefore, abdicated the throne, at which Ramakanta, son of Nahar Khora was made king. Coins were struck on his name.

Trail 
Then began the trail of detenuse. Kirti Chandra Barbarua, the Buragohain, the Borgohain and many were executed. But Lakshmi Singha was spared at the intercession of the Mayamara Mahanta. Kirtichandra Barbarua was executed on January 22, 1770, by being Pressed between unpolished wooden cylinders. His son Magha Singha was also executed on the same day.

New Government
The Mataks, thus becoming the masters of Rangpur, took to their hands the formation of their government. They killed Mohanmala Gohain for alleged sympathy with his deposed brother Lakshmi Singha, and poisoned the other two ahom Princes Charu Singha and RatneswarThe newly formed government selected all the officers amongst them, soon turned corrupted, Lacking in experience. Ragha became the Barbarua and the Deka Mahanta was made the king. The new king was offered a kekuradola (Palquin), a sword, seven elephants and thirteen horses as the insingia of royalty. The deposed king Lakshmi Singha was then brought and made to satule the latter. Hearing the news, The Mahanta became very angry and sent the following message to his son-
 
The Deka Mahanta thought of over the matter and to please his father, abdicated the office of king and returned to his place, and Ramakanta was raised as the king, son of Naharkhora Saika and showed honour to Radha and Rukmini, who along with some of their colleagues, who had been playing an important role in the organizational work. Ramakanta struck novagonal coins in imitations of the octagonal coins of the Ahoms. The new officers then requested  Mahanta Astabhujdeva to pay a visit to Rangpur to give his suggestions to reconstruct the administrative structure. When the Mahanta came to Rangpur, Ragha proposed that he should make all the people his disciples, but the Mahanta restricted his initiations to only those who were not formally initiated by any Mahanta or Gosain. The head of the all Satra  of the Brahma Samathi were then put into confinement and made to pay fines as follows- Auniati and Dakhinpat Satradhikars Rs. 8,000 each, Garmur and Kurubahi Satradhikars  R.s 4,000 each, and other junior Satras depending on their status. This penalty was imposed on these Satras were imposed as they were lending support to the erstwhile government and were believed to be at the back of the persecution of the Mayamara Mahanta and desciples. The head of Auniati Satra had his nose, ear cutten off and  eyes extracted out. But the newly formed government could not take any effective step to reform the socio-political fabric of the kingdom, aiming at general welfare. The royalist who came over the side of the Moamoriayas were frustrated to find that the Moamoriays rule was the same old one only with new set of officers. They, therefore, looked to the deposed Ahom King as their real ruler and started making plans to reinstate him.

Restoration of Lakshmi Singha
The Mataks did not have any superior military strength. Their strongest weapon was their unity. Now that dissension took place between the King Ramakanta and Ragha Borbarua, who was his premier, the subject-people were confused. Meanwhile many Matak leaders returned to their natural occupation of agriculture, they could not afford to remain absent from the fields for too long. The weaknesses on the part of the rebels were properly utilized by the royalist, they appointed one Ramakrishnai, son of Jadhav Tamuli to secretly contact Kuranganayani,  who soon organised a strong counter offensive. The royalist leaders planned to utilise the Rangali Bihu Samkranti day (Chaitra-Samkranti of the year 1770) as their day of action and decided to enter the residence of Ragha on that night in guise of a Huchary party, each secretly armed with a sword.  They managed to get support of Kuranganayani, the Manipuri queen of Rajeswar Singha and later of his brother Lakshmi Singha, who was forcibly taken as wife by Ragha on the deposition of Lakshmi Singha. On the Assamese New Year's Day in 1770 (14 April), through the machination of Kuranganayani, Ragha was killed by a Huchary party. Ramakanta escaped but was shortly afterwards captured and put to death. Lakshmi Singha was then brought back from his place of confinement and reinstated on the throne. The restored Ahom monarchy ordered a general massacre of the Morans, who were the most prominent among the rebels. Nahar and Radha were captured and were brutally put to death. Ramakanata was also seized in his father-in-law's place was killed in a similar brutal way. Persons were sent to seize the moran officers at Guwahati. Many of them including Rukmini were captured and killed.Soon after the restoration, Lakshmi Singha awarded his officers by appointing them in high offices. He then convened a council of ministers regarding the steps that should be taken against the rebels. One such, Ghanashyam Buragohain, who was the most influential and the premier, advocated a policy of ruthless suppression. He states thus-  The eloquency of Ghanashyam Buragohain prevailed upon the opinions of the rest and the king, ordered a vigorous persecution of the Mataks.  The remaining part of Lakshmi Singha's reign was spent in suppressing various rebellions and conspiracies. Many of these conspiracies were organised by exiled princes like Bhudar Singha, Malau Tipamiya Gohain sons or grandsons of previous kings. Considering that the banished Ahom princes were at the root of all these troubles, they were transferred to Toklai near present town of Jorhat for more effective surveillance. In 1779, the Chutias of Sadiya also started a rebellion under a Nara chief of Khamjang and killed the Sadiya-Khowa Gohain, but they were subdued

Revolt of Kalia Phukan

Revolt of Kalita Phukan
The Kalita Phukan was dismissed for complaints of exactions by people of Narayanpur or at the instance of the nobles, whereupon he proceeded to Tarnulbari on the north bank of the Lohit and proclaimed himself king and assumed the name Mirhang, collected a force and constructed a fort at Kechamati. An army was sent against him, he escaped by bribing his captors but was recaptured and executed.

Religious Policies 

The religious policy of Lakshmi Singha also created schism within the Sakta camp itself. Being refused initiation by the Parvatiya Gosain on ground of his illegitimacy, Lakshmi Singha accepted Ramananda Acharyya, an Assamese Brahmana, as his religious preceptor and established him at Pahumara. The Acharyya for that reason came to be known as Pahumariya Gosain.He was also called the Na-Gosain. This led to a dissension between the followers of the Parvatiya Gosain and the Na-Gosain. The Parvatiya Gosain, with a view to deposing Lakshmi Singha supported the conspiracy of Bhudar Singha and Malau Tipamiya Gohain. When this was revealed to him, Lakshmi Singha expelled the Parvatiya Gosain from the land and promulgated and order prohibiting initiation from him. The order of expulsion was subsequently withdrawn, but the schism once created could not be wiped out.

Influence of Deodhais 
The Deodhais tried to regain their former influence, scribed the misfortunes to the adoption of Hindu beliefs and practices and abandonment of the old- tribal practices
and observances, and miscarriage of projects to starting them on days selected by Ganaks as auspicious, but inauspicious, according to Ahom astrologers calculations. To undo the mischief resulting from the cremation of Rajeswar Singh's body, they made an effigy of him in clay and having performed the Rikkhvan ceremony for the restoration of life and offered sacrifices to the Gods, interred it with the usual rites. Though for some time Lakshmi Singha became favorably disposed to the Deodhais, the Hindus soon regained their influence, at the suggestion of the Na Gosain, the Goddess Tara was worshipped with great ceremony and immense money was distributed to Brahmans, the Deodhais refused participation.

Death 
Lakshmi Singha after a reign of 11 years, died at the age of 67. The king made his only son Lokenath Gohain the Jubraj or the heir-apparent during his lifetime. He suffered from chronic dysentery and died on 13 December 1780. His body was cremated at Hatikhok-ghat on the bank of Dikhow and the ashes and bones were taken and then entombed at Charaideo after a funeral ceremony performed according to Hindu rites.

Administrative Works 
Administrative works of Lakshmi Singha were- 
 
Bogi Dol
Rudrasagarar Dol
Gauri Ballabh Dol
Iswaneswar
Siv Dol
Hajor Jay Durga Mandir
Janardan Mandir
Bogi Dolor Pukhuri
Rudrasagar Pukhuri
Gauri Ballabh Pukhuri
Ligiri Pukhuri.

See also
 Ahom dynasty
 Kuranganayani
 Moamoria rebellion

Notes

References 

Gogoi, Padmeshwar (1968), The Tai and the Tai Kingdoms
Comprehensive history of Assam, SL Baruah.
1970 Assam in the Ahom Age 1228-1826 by Basu s. 

Ahom kingdom
Ahom kings
1713 births
1780 deaths
Hindu monarchs
18th-century Indian monarchs